Douglas León, known by his stage name Dogge Doggelito (born 24 July 1975) is a Swedish rapper, lecturer, author and artist. He is also among the founders of The Latin Kings (TLK) -- one of Sweden's most successful rap groups. Doggelito is one of the most acclaimed rap artists in Sweden.

Early life 
Douglas Leon was born in Alby, Norra Botkyrka in Stockholm on 1975, to a Venezuelan father and a Swedish mother. He has jokingly referred to himself as "Half Indian, half Viking". He grew up in the 80's and became familiar to hip hop in an early age and sooner or later it became a big part of his life. Although he initially wanted to be an actor, he was not accepted into any of the schools. He started to rap in 1983. He participated in many rap contests, including winning third place in Rap SM with his group The Latin Kings, and also in his teens he was a member in a break dance group. His brother also had big influence on him towards a career in rap music.

The Latin Kings 

Dogge Doggelito formed his rap group The Latin Kings (TLK) with his friends, the brothers DJ Chepe and Salla (The Salazar Brothers). They formed the group in 1991, and came third in a rap contest in 1992. Their breakthrough came in 1994, when the group along with the help of the producer Gordon Cyrus, released their first album titled, Välkommen till förorten. The album received huge success and was awarded with two grammys and other awards. The band split up in 2005. Today he is working on music and also in the book and TV business. For example, he starred in commercials for the Swedish electronics company Elgiganten. He has also released a book with the language professor Ulla-Britt Kotsinas, named "Förortsslang". He has also appeared in movies and TV shows.

Personal life 
He has four children including three daughters. His wife Leonida died of cancer in 2004; they had one daughter together named, Bianca. Another daughter died during childbirth. He is the elder brother of the model Daphne Leon, and also the cousin of rapper El Primo.

He is a Christian, born in the Swedish Church, although he calls himself an Orthodox Christian. In 2006, he reportedly voted for the Communist Party (Sweden). He is a staunch advocate for anti-Racism, and has dismissed the Swedish immigrant policies. He has also said that "Even if you are Swedish-born, from the suburbs, you're not viewed as Swedish".

Apart from rap, he listens to Venezuelan salsa from the 70s. His favourite food is pabellón, the Venezuelan national dish.

Discography 
2007 – Superclasico

Bibliography
Förortsslang (2004)
Habib: på farligt vatten (2007)
Izzy & Gänget (2011)
Lata dagar (2011)
Shuno (2012)

References 

1975 births
Living people
Swedish rappers
Swedish male actors
Swedish people of Venezuelan descent
Musicians from Stockholm
People from Alby, Botkyrka
Melodifestivalen contestants of 2010